The Korea Volleyball Association (KVA) (hangul : 대한민국배구협회) is the governing body for volleyball in South Korea. It is a member of the Korean Sport & Olympic Committee. It has exclusive rights to represent South Korea, such as the FIVB and the AVC, to the International Sports Organization. The KVA is responsible for organizing the South Korea men's national volleyball team and South Korea women's national volleyball team.

It was launched in March, 1946. In 2007, it became a corporation aggregate.

Activities
The main business of the association is as follows.

Review and decide on basic policy 
Hold and participate in international competitions 
Hosting and supervising domestic competitions 
Research and improvement in athletic ability
Training of players, referees, and operational personnel

See also
List of international sport federations
Korea Primary Volleyball Federation

References

External links
 

South Korea
Volleyball in Asia
Volleyball in South Korea
1946 establishments in Korea